Nork or NORK may refer to:

Places
Nork, Yerevan, Armenia
Nork, Surrey, England

Slang 
Nork, slang for a Norinco firearm
Nork, a slang demonym for North Koreans
Norks, Australian slang for breasts

Other uses
New Orleans Rhythm Kings, an early 1920s jazz band